CJUS-FM was a Canadian radio station, which aired in Saskatoon, Saskatchewan from 1965 to 1985. It was a campus radio station operated by the University of Saskatchewan. Studios were initially located in the basement of the university's Memorial Union Building, but were moved to the basement of the Education Building in 1980 next to the Department of Audio Visual Services.

The station was launched through a partnership between the university's board of governors and its student union. For a number of years, the station also aired some programming from the CBC Stereo network before CBKS was launched.

In 1983, with the station in financial trouble, it began to accept limited commercial advertising, and briefly changed its call sign to CHSK. The following year, the university's board decided to discontinue its funding of the station, and CHSK ceased broadcasting on September 30, 1985.

The university has never applied for another broadcast license. It maintains an informal relationship with the independent community radio station CFCR-FM, which actively solicits volunteers among the university's student body.

In 2005, CJUS was relaunched as an Internet radio stream.

References

External links 
 History of the University of Saskatchewan: CJUS-FM launched

Jus
Jus
Internet radio stations in Canada
University of Saskatchewan
Radio stations established in 1965
Radio stations disestablished in 1985
1965 establishments in Saskatchewan
1985 disestablishments in Saskatchewan
JUS-FM